The 2008 Istanbul Cup was a women's tennis tournament played on outdoor clay courts. It was the 4th edition of the Istanbul Cup, and was part of the Tier III Series of the 2008 WTA Tour. It took place  in Istanbul, Turkey, from 19 May through 24 May 2008. Second-seeded Agnieszka Radwańska won the singles title and earned $30,500 first-prize money.

Finals

Singles

 Agnieszka Radwańska defeated  Elena Dementieva, 6–3, 6–2
 It was Agnieszka Radwańska's 2nd title of the year, and her 3rd overall.

Doubles

 Jill Craybas /  Olga Govortsova defeated  Marina Erakovic /  Polona Hercog, 6–1, 6–2

External links
 Official website
 ITF tournament edition details
 Tournament draws

Istanbul Cup
İstanbul Cup
2008 in Turkish tennis
May 2008 sports events in Turkey